John William Campbell was deputy mayor of Freetown, Sierra Leone. He was a Creole of Egba and Ife descent. His family was prominent amongst the Creoles in the early 1900s. His mother, Sarah Campbell, was an Egba while his father, John Campbell, was an Ife. His brother William Campbell was a businessman at Connaught Hospital in Freetown, Sierra Leone. An elder brother also called John William Campbell, was Justice of Peace of the Colony of Sierra Leone. 

John William Campbell's burial place is at the Racecourse Cemetery in Freetown.

See also
Mayors of Freetown, Sierra Leone

References
http://cocorioko.slvp.org/app/index.php?option=com_content&task=view&id=146&Itemid=1

William John
Mayors of Freetown
Sierra Leone Creole people
Year of birth missing
Year of death missing